Halfway House Estate is a suburb of Johannesburg, South Africa. It is located in Region A and is part of the city known as Midrand.

Town some 27 km north of Johannesburg and 18 km north-west of Kempton Park. It was laid out in 1890 and called thus because it was the stop halfway between Johannesburg and Pretoria for the Zeederberg coach service.

References

Johannesburg Region A